Ryōzō, Ryozo or Ryouzou (written: 良三 or 亮三) is a masculine Japanese given name. Notable people with the name include:

, the 5th President of the Japanese Olympic Committee
, Japanese botanist
, Japanese lawyer and diplomat
, Japanese editor, writer and translator
, former Japanese football player

See also
21460 Ryozo, main-belt asteroid

Japanese masculine given names